Gino Pivatelli (born 27 March 1933) is a former Italian footballer and manager who played as a striker. An agile and technically gifted centre-forward, with a powerful right-footed shot, although he was a prolific goalscorer, he was also a highly versatile player, who was capable of playing in a creative role as a second striker or attacking midfielder, in deeper midfield positions, or as a defender, in addition to his usual position of forward.

Club career
Throughout his club career, Pivatelli most notably played for A.C. Milan (1961–63); he also played for Hellas Verona F.C. (1950–53), Bologna F.C. 1909 (1953–60), and S.S.C. Napoli (1960–61). After being dropped from the Inter Youth Side, Pivatelli was acquired by Verona in 1950, with whom he made his Serie B debut at the age of 17, scoring his first professional goal in his second appearance with the club, in a 4–1 victory over Vicenza. The following season, he was promoted to the starting line-up, and scored a total of 25 goals in 68 games for his team during the next three seasons, also helping the struggling club avoid relegation. After joining Bologna in 1953, he made his Serie A debut with the club on 13 September 1953, in a 2–1 home win over Atalanta. With the Emilian side, he was the Serie A top-scorer during the 1955–56 Serie A season, with 29 league goals in 30 appearances, and was the only Italian player to win the Capocannoniere title during the 1950s. In total, he scored 105 goals for Bologna during his seven seasons with the club. After playing with Napoli for the 1960–61 season, he joined Milan in 1961, and was part of the side that won the Serie A title in 1962, and the European Cup in 1963 under manager Nereo Rocco, after which he subsequently retired from playing professional football.

International career
Pivatelli was included in Italy for the 1954 FIFA World Cup in Switzerland, although he did not appear during the tournament. He made his senior international debut for Italy on 30 March 1955, at the age of 22, wearing the number 10 shirt, and scoring the match-winning goal in a 2–1 friendly away victory over reigning World Champions West Germany, in Stuttgart. He scored his second international goal against Portugal on 22 December 1957, in a 1958 FIFA World Cup qualifying match. In total he earned 7 caps and scored 2 goals for the national team between 1954 and 1958.

Honours

Club
Milan
Serie A: 1961–62
European Cup: 1962–63

Individual
Serie A Top Goal-scorer: 1955–56 (29 goals)

References

1933 births
Living people
Sportspeople from the Province of Verona
1954 FIFA World Cup players
A.C. Milan players
Bologna F.C. 1909 players
Hellas Verona F.C. players
Italian footballers
Italy international footballers
S.S.C. Napoli players
Serie A players
Serie B players
Italian football managers
Calcio Padova managers
Association football forwards
UEFA Champions League winning players
A.C. Monza managers
Footballers from Veneto